The Tanduay Rhum Makers (1975-1987) and Tanduay Rhum Masters (1999-2001) were two basketball franchises associated with the same liquor brand that played in the Philippine Basketball Association (PBA).

The original franchise, owned by Elizalde & Co., Inc., was a founding member of the PBA.  From 1975-1980, the team played under the name Tanduay Distillery; Tanduay ESQ and Tanduay Esquires; then as, YCO-Tanduay in 1981-1983.  The final name used by the original franchise was the Tanduay Rhum Makers (1983-1987).  The original franchise won a total of three PBA championships.  In 1988, its PBA franchise was acquired by Pure Foods Corporation and played as Purefoods.

The second franchise played under the name Tanduay Rhum Masters and was owned by Tanduay Distillers, Inc. (the present owners of the Tanduay liquor business).  It first played in the Philippine Basketball League (1997-1999) and joined the PBA (1999-2001). The PBA records of the original Tanduay PBA franchise (1975-1987) were maintained for the second incarnation. Its PBA franchise was sold to FedEx Express in 2002.

The original Tanduay franchise (Elizalde era, 1975-1987)

Businessman Manuel “Manolo” Elizalde formed the Philippines' first basketball dynasty, the YCO Painters, during the post-war era. Players who have donned the famous YCO red and white jersey included Carlos Loyzaga, Carlos Badion, Loreto Carbonell, Ed Ocampo, Mariano Tolentino and Kurt Bachmann. Its rivalry with the Ysmael Steel Admirals preceded that of Crispa and Toyota in the PBA.

The first Tanduay basketball team was organized by Elizalde during the early 1960s to compete in a minor league called Businessmen’s Athletic Association (BAA). This farm team of the YCO Painters had a brief existence.

In 1975, Elizalde became actively involved in the formation of the Philippine Basketball Association as he joined forces with several MICAA team owners to break away from the Basketball Association of the Philippines stranglehold. The YCO Painters maintained their ballclub in the MICAA and their newly-formed professional team was named Tanduay.

1977-1980

With Carlos Loyzaga handling the coaching chores by 1977, replacing Bobby Littaua, Tanduay entered the semifinals for the first time in the 1977 All-Filipino Conference and almost made it to the finals but lost to Mariwasa-Honda Panthers on their last assignment as the Panthers went on to play the Crispa Redmanizers for the championship. The season had a Tanduay player Jaime Taguines becoming the second recipient of the Rookie of the Year honors.  

In 1978, Tanduay had their first breakthrough year. After a third and fourth place finishes in the first two conferences of the season, the third conference Invitational Championship allows the Esquires to simultaneously field their two imports. Gene Moore and David Payne led the team to score upset victories and enter the finals series against the Toyota Tamaraws. The Esquires lost to defending champion Toyota in four games. Tanduay again produced another Rookie of the Year awardee for the second straight season in Jaime Manansala.

1979-1984 
The next six seasons would remain unfruitful and title-less campaign for the Tanduay ballclub despite being competitive and a darkhorse team in the early 1980s, signing some top amateur stars like Rey Lazaro, former San Beda Red Lions Frankie Lim and JB Yango. The team had a revamp of their lineup in 1984, giving up four of its veteran players, Roberto dela Rosa, Victor Sanchez, Alberto Gutierrez and Mike Bilbao to newcomer Beer Hausen.

1985–1987
Following the disbandment of the famed Crispa Redmanizers, the Tanduay Rhum Makers had a massive rebuilding, acquiring Crispa stars Abet Guidaben, Freddie Hubalde and Padim Israel, along with Willie Generalao from Gilbey's Gin. However, three weeks after the start of the 1985 PBA Reinforced Conference, Guidaben was traded in favor of Ramon Fernandez from Manila Beer. Tanduay's coach at that time, Orly Castelo, was also replaced by former Gilbey's Gin coach Arturo Valenzona.

Tanduay finally won the first of three PBA championships beginning in the 1986 First Conference, behind imports Rob Williams and Andre Mckoy.  After winning its first title, the team brought the championship trophy to the grave of their late owner, Manolo Elizalde, who died a year before. Tanduay won their second straight championship in the 1986 PBA All-Filipino Conference and their third title in the 1987 PBA Open Conference with best import David Thirdkill.

Disbandment

A business blackeye occurred in late 1987 when a couple of Tanduay drinkers died allegedly owing to the liquor. This caused a major backlash in terms of sales as revenues collapsed and put parent company Elizalde & Company Inc. near bankruptcy.

Pure Foods Corporation, then a subsidiary of Ayala Corporation, acquired Tanduay's PBA franchise. The franchise would play under the name Purefoods beginning the 1988 PBA season.

The Tanduay business enterprise was acquired by the Lucio Tan group of companies.

Second Tanduay franchise (Tan era, 1997-2001)

In the Philippine Basketball League (1997-1999)

In 1997, the Tanduay name resurfaced in the Philippine basketball scene at the Philippine Basketball League under the ownership of Lucio Tan group of companies and managed by son Lucio "Bong" K. Tan, Jr. Prior to using the name "Tanduay Gold Rhum Masters", this team was originally known as Stag Pale Pilseners from 1995-1996, with Marlou Aquino, Bal David and Jason Webb in the lineup. The Rhum Masters won several PBL crowns under coach Alfrancis Chua and players Eric Menk, Jomer Rubi, Chris Cantonjos and Mark Telan. It also held a PBL-record 18 straight wins in the 1998–1999 Yakult PBL Centennial Cup, but lost in five games to Doctor J Rubbing Alcohol, when the Centennial Rhum Masters blew a 2–0 lead in the best-of-five affair.  After the team moved to the PBA, Asia Brewery retained the PBL franchise and was renamed Colt 45 with Renren Ritualo leading the squad. Colt 45 placed fourth in the 1999 PBL Challenge Cup before disbanding.

Return to the PBA (1999-2001)

In 1999, Tanduay made its return to the PBA. As part of the agreement, the league allowed six players from Tanduay's PBL lineup to be elevated. Tanduay also acquired Fil-American Earl Sonny Alvarado as the top pick.  The records from the original Tanduay franchise (1975-1987) were retained for this franchise.

In its first season, Tanduay placed second to Shell in the 1999 PBA All-Filipino Conference but their second stint in the PBA were marred by several controversies such as the deportation of alleged "Fil-sham" (bogus Filipino) Alvarado which led to a forfeiture of several Tanduay games during the 2000 season.  In the 2001 offseason, Tanduay made soundwaves in the PBA when they signed Danny Ildefonso of corporate rival San Miguel Beermen a whopping 16-year, 98 million peso offersheet. The league though, nullified the said deal since it was believed that the offersheet violated the team's salary cap.

Bong Tan also made a controversial comment calling the PBA, "a San Miguel league", a reference to a speculation that the PBA is favoring the then-San Miguel Corporation teams San Miguel and Barangay Ginebra. It was also said that Tanduay violated the PBA's salary cap many times by having their players sign a separate contract apart from the required PBA Uniform Player's Contract that made the players richer than any PBA team's bench players by a few hundred thousand pesos.  This was already denied by the management.

Disbandment

Realizing its failure to win a championship despite a stellar line-up of Fil-American players and established veterans, Tanduay disbanded after the 2001 season, selling its PBA franchise to FedEx Express for a reported sum of PHP 60-75 million.  A firesale ensued as the Rhum Masters traded their key players Eric Menk (to Barangay Ginebra Kings), Dondon Hontiveros (to the San Miguel Beermen) and Jeffrey Cariaso (to the Coca-Cola Tigers).

Season-by-season records

Awards

Individual awards

PBA Press Corps Individual Awards

Notable players
In alphabetical order. Members of PBA Hall of Fame and PBA 25 Greatest Players are in boldface.

First Tanduay team (Elizalde era, 1975-1987) 

 Ramon Fernandez - #19
 Abet Guidaben - #5
 Freddie Hubalde - #10
 Allan Abelgas - #34
 Dennis Abbatuan - #18
 Ronnie Albor - #16
 Zito "Chito" Bacon - #5
 Raymundo "Chuck" Barreiro - #4
 Miguel “Mike” Bilbao - #4, #6, #20, #40
 Rene Canent -  #18
 Eleazar "Ely" Capacio -  #15
 David "Boy" Cezar - #17
 Benjamin “Benjie” Cleofas - #15 
 Ricardo "Joy" Cleofas - #16
 Ramon "Onchie" dela Cruz - #9
 Roberto "Bert" dela Rosa - #7
 Valerio "Botchok" delos Santos - #10
 Joselito "Lito" Eguia - #12
 Angelito "Itoy" Esguerra - #16
 Wilfredo “Willie” Generalao - #42
 Alberto "Abet" Gutierrez - #9 & #13
 Cesar "Boy" Ijares - #36
 Federico “Padim” Israel  #17
 Rudolfo "Rudy" Lalota - #9
 Zaldy Latoza - #10
 Reynaldo "Rey" Lazaro - #12
 Frankie Lim - #4, #14
 Geronimo Lucido - #12 1976 Rookie of the Year
 Jaime "Jimmy" Manansala - #11 1978 Rookie of the Year
 Alexander "Alex" Marquez #44 - "The Kamikaze Kid" 
 Abelardo "Abe" Monzon #2, #22 & #44
 Horacio "Ace" Moreno - #88 & #8
 Jerry Pingoy - #14
 Marte Samson - #11
 Quirino "Rino" Salazar - #7
 Victor "Vic" Sanchez - #14, #12 – "Rambo"
 David "Dave" Supnet #66 & #6
 Jaime "Jimmy" Taguines - #44 - 1977 Rookie of the Year
 Alex Tan -#40
 Antonio "Tony" Torrente - #7
 Reynaldo "Rey" Vallejo -#1
 Luis "Tito" Varela -#32 - "Kojak" 
 Freddie Webb - #14 – "Fastbreak Freddie"
 Jose Bernardo "JB" Yango - #24 - "The Cuyapo Kid"

Imports

 Benny "The Outlaw" Anders #0 (1986)
 Odell Ball #41 (1980)
 Curtis Berry #00 (1982)
 Bill Bozeat #12 (1976)
 Kevin Cluess #35 (1980)
 Bernie Harris #35 (1977)
 Mark Haymore #32 (1981)
 Jerome Henderson #31 (1982)
 Tim Hirten #20 (1976)
 Andre McKoy #33 (1986)
 George Melton #33 (1983)
 Gene Moore (1978, 1981)
 Russell Murray #33 (1981-1982)
 David Payne #36 (1978)
 David Pope #66 (1985)
 Lawyer (Butch) Taylor #44 (1980)
 John Terry #24 (1975)
 David Thirdkill #22 (1987)
 Andy Thompson #22 (1986)
 John Q. Trapp #34 (1975)
 Ronnie Valentine - #44 (1985)
 Freeman Williams#20 (1987)
 Rob Williams #21 (1986) 
 Merlin Wilson #44(1979, 1985)
 Francois Wise #3 (1983)

Second Tanduay team (Tan era, 1999-2001)

 Rene Alforque #18
 Sonny Alvarado #15 - "The Punisher"
 Chris Cantonjos #33
 Jeffrey Cariaso #28 – "The Jet"
 Jayvee Gayoso #22 – "Mr. Adrenaline"
 Dondon Hontiveros #7 - "Cebuano Hotshot"
 Rudy Hatfield – "The H-Bomb" #34
 Pido Jarencio #25 – "The Fireman"
 Bobby Jose #11 – "The Firecracker"
 Noli Locsin #6 – "The Tank"
 Eric Menk #30 - "Major Pain"
 Dindo Pumaren #10 – "The Bullet"
 Mark Telan #13
 Jomar Rubi #7
 Jason Webb #1

Imports

 Maurice Bell #3/4 (2000-2001)
 Joe Ira Clark #24 (1999-2000)
Ronnie Fields #20 (1999)
Kevin Freeman #33  (2001)
Billy Thomas #12 (2001)

See also
 YCO Painters (precursor of the first Tanduay team)
 Stag Pale Pilseners (precursor of the second Tanduay team)
 Tanduay Light Rhum Masters (PBA D-League team, 2011–present)
 Cossack Blue Spirits (PBL team of Tanduay Distillers, Inc.)

References

 
Basketball teams established in 1975
2001 disestablishments in the Philippines
Basketball teams disestablished in 2001
Defunct Philippine Basketball Association teams
Former Philippine Basketball League teams
1975 establishments in the Philippines